Speak Now is the third studio album by American singer-songwriter Taylor Swift, released on October 25, 2010, through Big Machine Records. Swift wrote the standard edition of the album entirely herself within two years, while she was promoting her second studio album Fearless (2008). Inspired by Swift's transition from adolescence into adulthood, Speak Now is a loose concept album about her confessions regarding love and heartache, with some songs about her public experiences. Produced by Swift and Nathan Chapman, the album combines country pop, pop rock, and power pop with rock sensibilities and melodies characterized by acoustic instruments, dynamic electric guitars, strings, and drums.

After the album's release, Swift embarked on the Speak Now World Tour, which visited Asia, Europe, North America, and Oceania from February 2011 to March 2012. The album was supported by six singles, including the US Billboard Hot 100 top-ten singles "Mine" and "Back to December", and the US Hot Country Songs number ones "Sparks Fly" and "Ours". Speak Now peaked atop charts and received multi-platinum certifications in Australia (double platinum) and Canada (triple platinum). In the US, it sold one million copies within its first release week, spent six weeks at number one on the Billboard 200, and was certified six times platinum by the Recording Industry Association of America (RIAA).

Speak Now received generally positive reviews from music critics for offering emotional engagement and radio-friendly songs. Some critics complimented Swift's grown-up perspective, but others took issue with the songs about vengeance and heartbreak as shallow. At the 54th Annual Grammy Awards in 2012, Speak Now was nominated for Best Country Album, and its third single "Mean" won Best Country Song and Best Country Solo Performance. The album appeared in 2010s decade-end lists by Billboard and Spin, and on Rolling Stone 2012 list of the "50 Best Female Albums of All Time". Critics have retrospectively named Speak Now one of the best country albums of the 2010s and described its songs about Swift's public image a precedent to her songwriting on subsequent albums.

Background 

American singer-songwriter Taylor Swift released her second studio album Fearless through Nashville-based Big Machine Records in November 2008. The album spent 11 weeks at number one on the US Billboard 200, the longest chart run for a female country music artist. It was the best-selling album of 2009 in the US, making then-20-year-old Swift the youngest artist to have an annual best-seller since Nielsen SoundScan began tracking album sales in 1991. Two of the album's singles, "Love Story" and "You Belong with Me", performed well on both country and pop radio, bringing Swift to mainstream prominence. "Love Story" was the first country song to reach number one on the Mainstream Top 40 chart and "You Belong with Me" was the first country song to top the all-genre Radio Songs chart. At the 52nd Annual Grammy Awards in February 2010, Fearless won Album of the Year and Best Country Album, and its single "White Horse" won Best Female Country Vocal Performance and Best Country Song.

The success of Fearless made Swift one of country music's biggest stars to crossover into the mainstream market. At the 2009 MTV Video Music Awards, where Swift won Best Female Video for "You Belong with Me", rapper Kanye West interrupted her acceptance speech; the incident received widespread media coverage and became known as "Kanyegate". At the 52nd Annual Grammy Awards, Swift sang "You Belong with Me" and "Rhiannon" with Stevie Nicks; some critics commented Swift performed with weak vocals. MTV News commented the MTV Awards incident transformed Swift into a "bona-fide mainstream celebrity", and The New York Times said it was refreshing to see a talented singer-songwriter like Swift "make the occasional flub". Swift began writing for her third studio album immediately after she released Fearless and continued during her Fearless Tour in 2009 and 2010.

Writing and lyrics 
Because of her extensive touring schedule, Swift wrote her third album alone; "I'd get my best ideas at 3:00 a.m. in Arkansas, and I didn't have a co-writer around so I would just finish it. That would happen again in New York and then again in Boston and that would happen again in Nashville." Swift was inspired by her growth into adulthood and conceived Speak Now as a loose concept album about things she never had a chance to tell people she had met. As with her songwriting on previous albums, Swift strove to convey emotional honesty, writing details as specifically as possible, believing it is important for a songwriter to do so. She described her songs as "diary entries" about her emotions that helped her navigate adulthood. Swift chose not to follow the trend of making increasingly sexualized music by artists of her age, believing such a path would be incongruent with her artistic vision.

Departing from Fearless theme of fairy tales and starry-eyed romance, Speak Now explores introspection and backward-looking reflections on relationships. Its songs expanding on Swift's romantic tropes are mostly about monogamous relationships without sexual references, keeping her "good-girl" image intact. Many were inspired by Swift's public experience, including past relationships with high-profile celebrities, which received media attention during the album's promotional rollout. The confessional lyrics of Speak Now are more direct and confrontational than those on Swift's past albums. On "Back to December", she asks an ex-lover to forgive her wrongdoings. "Dear John" narrates a devastating relationship of a 19-year-old female narrator who accuses a much-older man of manipulating her with "dark, twisted games". Swift's encounter with an ex-lover at an awards show, where they ignored each other despite Swift feeling a need to speak to him inspired "The Story of Us". On "Better than Revenge", Swift affirms vengeance against a romantic rival who is known for "the things she does on the mattress".

Romantic optimism is another major theme of the album. The opening track "Mine" is about Swift's hope of attaining happiness despite her tendency to "run from love" to avoid heartbreak. It was the first song she included on the track list because it represents her then-new perspective of romance. Swift had written "Sparks Fly"—a song about dangerous hints of love at first sight—before she released her 2006 self-titled debut album. She re-recorded the song for Speak Now after she received fan request to release it at the 2010 CMA Music Festival. "Enchanted" describes the aftermath of an encounter with a special person without knowing whether the infatuation would be reciprocated. "Haunted" is about romantic obsession and "Last Kiss" explores the lingering feelings after a breakup. On "Long Live", Swift expresses gratitude to her fans and bandmates. The lyrics of "Enchanted" and "Long Live" incorporate high-school-prom and fairy-tale imagery that recalls the youthful optimism of Fearless.

Besides love and romance, Swift wrote about self-perception; "Never Grow Up" is a contemplation of her childhood, adulthood, and future. The self-aware "Mean", in which Swift sings about facing a man who had tried to take her down, was inspired by her detractors. Because of her confessional songwriting, the media became invested in Swift's personal life, believing each song is about a real person; an ex-lover, a friend, or an enemy. Although Swift was interested to hear the response from the people to whom she dedicated the songs, she did not publicly name them and believed they would realize this themselves. She did reveal that Kanye West, who interrupted Swift's acceptance speech at the 2009 MTV Video Music Awards, was the subject of "Innocent". In the track, Swift sings about forgiving a man who wronged her; according to Esquire, the track can be interpreted as "a simple lament of a lost love, or a former friend being forgiven". Swift wrote the title track after hearing a friend's ex-boyfriend was marrying another woman; in the lyrics, the protagonist crashes the ex-boyfriend's wedding and tries to halt it.

Swift wrote as many as 25 songs and by early 2010, she had begun to select songs for the album. To ensure the album would be coherent, she played the songs to her family, friends, and producer Nathan Chapman, who had produced for Swift since the recording of her self-titled debut album in 2006. Swift chose Enchanted as a working title but Big Machine Records executive Scott Borchetta recommended Swift choose a different title, deeming Enchanted unfit for the album's mature perspective. She settled on the title Speak Now, saying it best captures the album's essence: "I think it's such a metaphor, that moment where it's almost too late, and you've got to either say what it is you are feeling or deal with the consequences forever ... And this album seemed like the opportunity for me to speak now or forever hold my peace." Swift finalized the track list by June 2010.

Composition

Production 
Swift recorded much of Speak Now with Chapman at his Pain in the Art Studio in Nashville. Although Fearless commercial success allowed Swift to engage a larger group of producers, she worked solely with Chapman, believing they had a productive relationship. The recording process started with a demo; Swift recorded vocals and played guitar, and Chapman sang background vocals and played other instruments. After arranging the demos, Swift and Chapman approached engineers and other musicians to tweak some elements, including overdubs and programmed drums. The first track Chapman produced with Swift on Speak Now is "Mine", which they recorded within five hours.

Because of his artistic autonomy, Chapman said he was responsible for "60 percent of the music on the album, including 90 percent of the guitars". Much of his production for Speak Now is identical to that for Fearless; he programmed the drums with Toontrack's software Superior Drummer, played drums on the Roland Fantom G6 keyboard, added electric guitars to the arrangements, recorded Swift's vocals with an Avantone CV12 microphone and his background vocals with a Shure SM57, produced the bass with an Avalon VT737 preamplifier, and used Endless Audio's CLASP System to synchronize his editing on Pro Tools and Logic. Because of Swift's country-music vision, Chapman asked other musicians, mostly in Nashville, to replace his programmed drums with live drumming and add acoustic instruments such as fiddle. For instance, Chapman asked Steve Marcantonio to cut down programmed drums on "Mine" at Blackbird Studios in Nashville. For some tracks, including "Back to December", Swift and her team went to Capitol Studios in Los Angeles to record string orchestration.

After recording finished, Justin Niebank mixed the album on Pro Tools at Blackbird Studios; he had mixed some tracks on Fearless. Within three weeks, Niebank finished mixing 17 tracks including 14 on the standard edition and three bonus tracks on the deluxe edition. Because Swift wanted Speak Now to be a direct communication with her audience, Niebank infused monoaural reverberation inspired by 1950s and 1960s music in the mix to evoke a "vintage" and "retro" vibe that, according to Niebank, brought a sense of authenticity. Music engineer Hank Williams mastered the recordings. Because much of Speak Now was recorded and mixed in Nashville, Niebank believed the album stood out among popular records that were manipulated with contemporaneous technologies Auto-Tune and Melodyne. Although Chapman was responsible for much of the production, he said Swift's co-production credit is "not a vanity credit. We were really a team, very collaborative."

Music 

Speak Now follows the country pop production of Fearless with increasing elements of mainstream pop music. Critics debated the album's genre. Paste described the album as a blend of country and radio-friendly pop tunes with climatic build-ups and catchy hooks. Entertainment Weekly classified the album as pop and commented the only country elements are its "smattering of banjo pluck and dainty twang". According to BBC Music, Speak Now veers towards pop rock. Ann Powers, in a review for the Los Angeles Times, found the album borderline alternative rock and bubblegum pop with its songs experimenting with styles from "lush strings of Céline-style kitsch-pop to Americana banjo to countrypolitan electric guitar". Now described Speak Now as "slickly produced power pop".

Critics noted the banjo-led bluegrass track "Mean" as the album's pure country song. Much of the album consists of uptempo country pop melodies, exemplified by the opening track "Mine". Many tracks explore rock sensibilities, drawing from rock music of the late 1970s through the 1980s. "Sparks Fly" has an arena rock production with dramatic fiddles and guitars. The title track is an acoustic guitar-driven country pop song with a 1950s rock chorus. "The Story of Us" and "Better than Revenge" are electric-guitar-driven pop punk songs; the former contains influences of dance-pop and new wave. The arena-rock and goth-rock-inspired "Haunted" incorporates a dramatic, recurring string section. The closing track "Long Live" is a heartland rock song featuring girl-group harmonies and chiming rock guitars.

The remaining tracks of Speak Now are ballads. "Back to December" is a gentle, orchestral, string-laden ballad. Speak Now longest track, "Dear John" at six minutes and 43 seconds, is a slow-burning, bluesy, country-pop song with electric guitar licks. The guitar ballad "Never Grow Up" incorporates an understated production that accompanies its wistful lyrics. On "Enchanted", the acoustic guitar crescendos after each refrain, leading up to a harmony-layered coda at the end. The tracks "Innocent" and "Last Kiss" incorporate sparse instruments; the latter is a slow-tempo waltz with breathy vocals. "If This Was a Movie", a bonus song on the deluxe edition and the only song not written solely by Swift, is a fast-paced ballad with a recurring guitar riff and simple harmonies.

Release and promotion 

Swift announced details of Speak Now on July 20, 2010, in a live stream on Ustream. Big Machine Records released the lead single "Mine" to US country radio and digital download sites on August 3, 2010. The music video for "Mine" premiered on CMT on August 27, 2010. The single peaked at number three on the US Billboard Hot 100 and was certified triple platinum by the Recording Industry Association of America (RIAA). "Mine" reached number six in Japan, number seven in Canada, and number nine in Australia. On August 18, Swift released the album's cover art, which depicts Swift with curly hair and red lipstick twirling in a deep-purple gown. On September 15, Swift announced a Target-exclusive deluxe edition whose cover art is identical to that of the standard edition but the gown is red instead of purple. Starting from October 4, 2010, Swift released one Speak Now track each week on the iTunes Store as part of a three-week countdown campaign; the title track was released on October 5, followed by "Back to December" on October 12 and "Mean" on October 19. On October 22, Xfinity premiered a preview of "The Story of Us".

Big Machine Records released the standard and deluxe editions of Speak Now on October 25, 2010. The Target-exclusive CD+DVD edition contains 14 songs of the standard; the bonus tracks "Ours", "If This Was a Movie", and "Superman"; acoustic versions of "Back to December" and "Haunted"; a "pop mix" of "Mine"; a 30-minute behind-the-scenes video for "Mine"; and the music video for "Mine". The deluxe edition was released to other retailers on January 17, 2012. To bolster sales of the album, Swift had partnerships with Starbucks, Sony Electronics, Walmart, and Jakks Pacific. In October 2011, Swift partnered with Elizabeth Arden, Inc. to release her fragrance brand "Wonderstruck", whose name references the lyrics of "Enchanted".

To further promote Speak Now, Swift appeared on magazine covers and conducted press interviews. She performed "Innocent" at the 2010 MTV Video Music Awards. Her other performances at awards shows include the Country Music Association Awards and the American Music Awards in 2010; the Academy of Country Music Awards and the Country Music Association Awards in 2011. Swift also appeared on many television shows and concert specials, performing at Nashville's Country Music Hall of Fame and X Factor Italy. She embarked on a promotional tour in Japan, appearing on variety show SMAPxSMAP and music program Music Station. Her round of American television shows included Today, Late Show with David Letterman, The Ellen DeGeneres Show, Live with Regis and Kelly, and Dancing with the Stars. She also gave private concerts to contest winners, and played a semi-private concert for JetBlue at the John F. Kennedy International Airport in New York.

After "Mine", Swift released five more singles from Speak Now. "Back to December" and "Mean", which were earlier available for digital download, were released to US country radio on November 15, 2010, and March 13, 2011, respectively. The two singles peaked at numbers seven and ten, respectively, in Canada, and "Back to December" reached number six on the US Billboard Hot 100. "The Story of Us" was released to US pop radio on April 19, 2011. "Sparks Fly" and "Ours" were released to US country radio on July 18 and December 5, 2011, respectively. Prior to its single release, "Ours", together with the other deluxe edition tracks, was released for digital download via the iTunes Store on November 8, 2011. "Sparks Fly" and "Ours" reached the top 20 on the US Billboard Hot 100 and peaked atop the US Hot Country Songs chart. The RIAA certified all six of the album's singles at least platinum; "Back to December" and "Mean" sold over two million copies each, and were certified double-platinum and triple-platinum, respectively.

On November 23, 2010, Swift announced the Speak Now World Tour, which started in Singapore on February 9, 2011. The tour visited Asia and Europe before the North American leg started in Omaha, Nebraska, on May 27, 2011. Within two days of announcement, the tour sold 625,000 tickets. By April 2011, Swift had added another 16 shows to the North American leg. After the final US concert in New York City on November 22, 2011, the Speak Now World Tour had covered 80 sold-out North American shows. On August 10, 2011, Swift released a music video for "Sparks Fly" that includes footage from the tour. She released the album Speak Now World Tour – Live on November 21, 2011. In December 2011, Swift announced an extension of the tour to Australia and New Zealand starting in March 2012. Concluding on March 18, 2012, the Speak Now World Tour had covered 110 shows, visited 18 countries, and grossed $123.7 million.

Commercial performance 
Before Speak Now release, Big Machine shipped two million copies of the album to stores in the US. In the week ending November 13, 2010, the album debuted at number one on the US Billboard 200 chart, with first-week sales of 1,047,000 copies. It marked the highest single-week tally for a female country artist and became the first album since Lil Wayne's Tha Carter III (2008) to sell over one million copies in its first week of release. Media publications including Billboard, MTV, and The New York Times noted Speak Now first-week sales figures in the context of declining record sales brought about by the emergence of music download platforms. According to The New York Times, although the music industry in 2010 saw album sales "[plunging] by more than 50 percent in the last decade", the album's strong sales proved Swift "has transcended the limitations of genre and become a pop megastar". The Guinness World Records in 2010 recognized Speak Now as the fastest-selling album in the US by a female country artist.

In Speak Now first charting week, 11 of the standard edition's 14 tracks charted on the Billboard Hot 100, making Swift the first female artist to have 11 songs on the Hot 100 at the same time. After the digital release of the deluxe edition tracks in November 2011, "If This Was a Movie" charted at number 10 on the Hot 100, making Swift the first artist to have eight songs debut in the top 10. With this achievement, Speak Now had three songs peaking in the top 10 of the Billboard Hot 100—"Mine", "Back to December", and "If This Was a Movie". The album spent six non-consecutive weeks atop the Billboard 200. Speak Now was the third-best-selling album of 2010 in the US with sales of 2,960,000 copies. By October 2020, it had sold 4,710,000 copies in the US. The RIAA certified the album six-times platinum, denoting six million album-equivalent units based on sales, song downloads, and streaming.

Speak Now was a chart success in the wider English-speaking world, peaking atop the albums charts of Australia, Canada, and New Zealand. It charted at number four in Norway; number six in Ireland, Japan, and the United Kingdom; number eight in Mexico; and number ten in Spain. It was certified double-platinum in Australia and triple-platinum in Canada.

Critical reception 

Speak Now received generally positive reviews from contemporaneous critics. Metacritic, which assigns a normalized rating out of 100 to reviews from mainstream publications, gave the album an average score of 77 that was based on 20 reviews. AnyDecentMusic? compiled 10 reviews and gave it an average score of 6.9 out of 10.

Most critics approved of Swift's grown-up perspective on love and relationships. Reviews published in AllMusic, Entertainment Weekly, The Guardian, the Los Angeles Times, and Rolling Stone complimented the songs for portraying emotions with engaging narratives and vivid details. In AllMusic's review, Stephen Thomas Erlewine wrote; "[Swift] writes from the perspective of the moment yet has the skill of a songwriter beyond her years". American Songwriter approved of Swift's self-penned material and artistic control. In his consumer guide, Robert Christgau commented although the album is "overlong and overworked", the songs "evince an effort that bears a remarkable resemblance to care—that is, to caring in the best, broadest, and most emotional sense".

The album's dramatic themes of heartbreak and vengeance received mixed reviews. Spin and Now said although it includes some memorable tracks, Speak Now is blemished by celebrity, rage, and grievances. Slant Magazine lauded Swift's melodic songwriting for offering radio-friendly pop hooks but criticized the lyrics of "Dear John", "Mean", "Innocent", and "Better than Revenge" as shallow and shortsighted. According to Steven Hyden from The A.V. Club, those tracks are Speak Now strength; "Swift's niftiest trick is being at her most likeable when she's indulging in such overt nastiness". Entertainment Weekly agreed, deeming those tracks inevitable for Swift's artistic evolution. The Village Voice said Swift's songwriting is "not confessional, but dramatic", and found it more nuanced and mature compared to that of Fearless.

Other reviews focused on Speak Now production. Reviews published in Paste and Slant Magazine call it a catchy album with radio-friendly pop tunes; Paste was impressed by the crossover appeal but deemed the overall production dull. The Village Voice took issue with Swift's weak and strained vocals. BBC Music found the album's track list too long but called it overall a "sparky and affecting record". Now approved of Swift's experimentation with styles other than country but considered it "too safe" and said the album is tarnished by "slickly produced power pop and a sugary sameness [that is] indiscernible from any number of today's radio-oriented artists". Ann Powers appreciated Speak Now soft, introspective tracks for personalizing pop music. Jon Caramanica of The New York Times lauded the experimentation with genres such as blues and pop punk, and called Speak Now a bold step for Swift.

Accolades 
Speak Now was ranked 13th on Rolling Stones list of the best albums of 2010. The New York Times Jon Caramanica ranked the album number two (behind Rick Ross's Teflon Don) in his 2010 year-end list. The album appeared on lists of the best country albums of 2010; PopMatters ranked it fifth and The Boot ranked it second. In 2012, Speak Now appeared at number 45 on Rolling Stone list of the "50 Best Female Albums of All Time"; the magazine commented: "She might get played on the country station, but she's one of the few genuine rock stars we've got these days, with a flawless ear for what makes a song click." In 2019, Billboard listed Speak Now in 51st place on its list of the best albums of the 2010s and second on its list of best country albums of the same decade. The album also ranked 37th on Spin 2010s decade-end list and 71st on that of Cleveland.com; and Taste of Country named it the fourth-best country album of the 2010s.

Speak Now received industry awards and nominations. In the US, it was nominated for Album of the Year at the Academy of Country Music Awards, the American Country Awards, and in 2011 the Country Music Association Awards. At the 2011 Billboard Music Awards, Speak Now was nominated for Top Billboard 200 Album and won Top Country Album. It won Favorite Album (Country) at the 2011 American Music Awards and Top Selling Album of 2011 by the Canadian Country Music Association; and was nominated for International Album of the Year at the 2011 Juno Awards and for International Album of the Year at the 2012 Canadian Independent Music Awards. At the 54th Annual Grammy Awards in 2012, Speak Now was nominated for Best Country Album, and its single "Mean" won Best Country Solo Performance and Best Country Song.

Impact and legacy 
Musicologist James E. Perone reflected that Speak Now came "at a curious point" in Swift's career. After her 2006 debut album marked her as a "singer-songwriter prodigy", and her 2008 album Fearless transformed her into a "bona fide star", Speak Now signified Swift's artistic maturity with nuanced observations, reflecting her young adulthood. In a 2019 Rolling Stone cover story, Swift said she wrote the album by herself as a reaction to her critics' doubts about her songwriting ability. Communication professor Myles McNutt argued that the self-written Speak Now was Swift's definite move to claim authorship to her music and career, contrary to other artists being commodified by their labels. Its commercial success contributed to her fame as a pop star transcending her self-identity as a country-music artist. Pitchfork Sam Sodomsky, reviewing the album in 2019, contended that her country-music identity served as an indicator of her autobiographical songwriting rather than musical style.

Critics and academics noted Speak Now in the context of Swift's celebrity. Some viewed the songs inspired by Swift's public experience, including relationships with high-profile celebrities and the 2009 MTV Awards incident, as a precedent to Swift's songwriting on subsequent albums, which received media attention throughout her career. As observed by gender studies professor Adriane Brown, the songs about idealized romance and her innocent, "good-girl" image made her stand out in a contemporary pool of sexualized female pop artists. Brown commented that Swift's unwillingness to openly discuss sex and tendency to criticize females who "whore themselves out", as in the lyrics of "Better than Revenge", were problematic. In Vulture, Maura Johnston remarked that although the songs about Swift's public experience were missteps, they hinted at her 2017 album Reputation, which explores Swift's public image and confrontation against her critics.

Track listing 

Notes
 International editions feature "Mine" (pop mix) as track 1, in place of the original version.
 The international Apple Music edition features the additional track "Mine" (US version).
 The international deluxe edition features three additional tracks: "Mine" (US version), "Back to December" (US version), and "The Story of Us" (US version).

Personnel 
Credits are adapted from the album's liner notes.

Musicians

 Taylor Swift – vocals, acoustic guitar, handclapping, vocal harmony, banjo
 Nathan Chapman – banjo, bass guitar, Fender Rhodes, electric twelve-string guitar, electric guitar, acoustic guitar, handclapping, mandolin, organ,  piano, synthesizer, vocal harmony
 Tom Bukovac – electric guitar
 Nick Buda – drums
 Chris Carmichael – strings
 Smith Curry – lap steel guitar
 Eric Darken – percussion
 Caitlin Evanson – vocal harmony
 Shannon Forrest – drums
 John Gardner – drums
 Rob Hajacos – fiddle
 Amos Heller – bass guitar
 Liz Huett – vocal harmony
 Tim Lauer – Hammond B3, piano
 Tim Marks – bass guitar
 Mike Meadows – electric guitar, handclapping
 Grant Mickelson – electric guitar
 Michael Rhodes – bass guitar
 Paul Sidoti – electric guitar
 Tommy Sims – bass guitar
 Bryan Sutton – acoustic guitar, twelve-string guitar, ukulele
 Al Wilson – handclapping, percussion

Production

 Taylor Swift – background vocals direction, liner notes, songwriter, producer
 Nathan Chapman – engineer, producer, programming
 Chuck Ainlay – engineer
 Joseph Anthony Baker – photography
 Steve Blackmon – assistant
 Drew Bollman – assistant, assistant engineer, engineer
 Tristan Brock-Jones – assistant engineer
 David Bryant – assistant engineer
 Paul Buckmaster – conductor, orchestral arrangements
 Jason Campbell – production coordination
 Chad Carlson – engineer
 Chris Carmichael – composer, string arrangements
 Joseph Cassell – stylist
 Steve Churchyard – engineer
 Mark Crew – mixing engineer
 Dean Gillard – production, mixing, additional instrumentation
 Jed Hackett – engineer
 Jeremy Hunter – engineer
 Aubrey Hyde – wardrobe
 Suzie Katayama – orchestra contractor
 Steve Marcantonio – engineer
 Seth Morton – assistant engineer
 Emily Mueller – production assistant
 Jemma Muradian – hair stylist
 John Netti – assistant engineer
 Bethany Newman – design, illustrations
 Josh Newman – design, illustrations
 Justin Niebank – engineer, mixing
 Mark Petaccia – assistant engineer
 Joel Quillen – engineer
 Matt Rausch – assistant
 Lowell Reynolds – engineer
 Mike Rooney – assistant engineer
 Austin Swift – photography
 Todd Tidwell – assistant engineer, engineer
 Lorrie Turk – make-up
 Matt Ward – production, mixing, additional instrumentation
 Hank Williams – mastering
 Brian David Willis – engineer
 Nathan Yarborough – assistant mixing engineer

Charts

Weekly charts

Year-end charts

Decade-end chart

All-time chart

Certifications and sales

See also 
 List of Billboard 200 number-one albums of 2010
 List of Billboard 200 number-one albums of 2011
 List of Top Country Albums number ones of 2010
 List of Top Country Albums number ones of 2011
 List of number-one albums of 2010 (Canada)
 List of number-one albums from the 2010s (New Zealand)
 List of number-one albums of 2010 (Australia)

Notes

References

Sources 
 
 

2010 albums
Big Machine Records albums
Taylor Swift albums
Albums produced by Nathan Chapman (record producer)
Albums produced by Taylor Swift
Canadian Country Music Association Top Selling Album albums
Country pop albums
Pop rock albums by American artists
Concept albums